Zbigniew Drzewiecki (8 April 189011 April 1971) was a Polish pianist who was for most of his life a teacher of pianists. He was especially associated with the interpretation of Frédéric Chopin's works. His pupils include several famous pianists of the 20th century, and his influence was therefore very pervasive.

Drzewiecki was born in Warsaw.  He commenced study under his father, and then, at Warsaw, under Oberfeldt and Pilecki. After he had matriculated he went (from 1909 to 1914) to Vienna, to the atelier of Theodor Leschetizky, where he studied with Marie Prentner, the master's assistant. He gave many recitals in Polish towns, and also in Vienna, Prague and Berlin.

In 1916 he became professor of advanced pianoforte classes at the  Warsaw Conservatory, and continued to teach there until his death in 1971. He assisted in establishing the International Chopin Piano Competition, and served upon their juries from the first occasion, 1927, until 1971. After the Second World War, and especially after the death of Józef Turczyński (1884–1953), he was considered the greatest Polish piano teacher.

Students

The following is an incomplete list of pianists who studied with Drzewiecki:

Ryszard Bakst
Enrique Bátiz Campbell
Felicja Blumental
Walter Buczynski
Paweł Chęciński
Halina Czerny-Stefańska
Jan Ekier
Róża Etkin-Moszkowska
Lidia Grychtołówna
Adam Harasiewicz
Władysław Kędra
Bolesław Kon
Li QiFang
Hiroko Nakamura
Edward Olearczyk
Eva Osińska
Regina Smendzianka
Marta Sosińska
John Tilbury
Fou Ts'ong
Roger Woodward
Eva Maria Zuk

Sources 

A. Eaglefield-Hull, Dictionary of Modern Music and Musicians (Dent, London 1924).
J. Methuen-Campbell, Chopin Playing from the Composer to the Present Day (Gollancz, London 1981).

1890 births
1971 deaths
Polish classical pianists
Male classical pianists
Piano pedagogues
Musicians from Warsaw
People from Warsaw Governorate
Academic staff of the Chopin University of Music
Academic staff of the Academy of Music in Kraków
20th-century classical pianists
20th-century male musicians
Recipients of the State Award Badge (Poland)